Rolleston may refer to:

Places
 Rolleston, Queensland, Australia
 Rolleston, Leicestershire, England
 Rolleston, Nottinghamshire, England
 Rolleston railway station
 Rolleston on Dove, Staffordshire, England
 Rolleston Hall
 Rolleston, New Zealand
 Mount Rolleston
 Rolleston River

People
 Arthur Rolleston (1867–1918), New Zealand cricketer and lawyer 
 Boyd Rolleston, fictional character 
 Christopher Rolleston (1817–1888), New South Wales public servant
 Frank Rolleston (1873–1946), New Zealand politician
 George Rolleston (1829–1881), English physician and zoologist
 Humphry Rolleston (1862–1944), English physician
 Humphry Rolleston (businessman) (born 1946), New Zealand businessman
 James Rolleston (born 1997), New Zealand actor 
 Jeremy Rolleston (born 1972), Australian sportsman 
 John Davy Rolleston, (1873–1946), English physician and folklorist
 Sir John Rolleston (British politician) (1848–1919), British Conservative politician
 John Rolleston (New Zealand politician) (1877–1956), New Zealand Member of Parliament
 Lancelot Rolleston (1785–1862), British Conservative Party politician
 Launcelot Rolleston (1737–1802), member of the Markeaton hunt
 Mary Rolleston (1845–1940), New Zealand salon-keeper
 Roger de Rolleston (died 1223), British Catholic priest
 Sam Rolleston, New Zealand rugby league footballer
 Samuel Rolleston, British Anglican priest
 T. W. Rolleston (1857–1920), Irish writer, literary figure and translator
 William Rolleston (1831–1903), New Zealand politician, public administrator, educationalist and Canterbury provincial superintendent